Teri Raah Main Rul Gai is a 2012 Pakistani drama serial directed by Amin Iqbal, produced by Asif Raza Mir and Babar Javed under their production banner A&B Entertainment and written by Maimoona Khursheed. The drama stars Samiya Mumtaz, Sami Khan and Yumna Zaidi in lead roles. The drama was first aired 6 October 2012 on Urdu 1, where it aired every Monday at 9:00 P.M. The drama was based on the novel of same name by Maimoona Khursheed.

Plot

Cast
Samiya Mumtaz
Sami Khan
Yumna Zaidi
Ayesha Gul
Farah Tufail
Rasheed Naz
Shaista Jabeen
Ali Tabish
Inam Khan
Hassan Noman
Samina Butt

Soundtrack
Theme song of the drama is Sung by Fariha Pervez and Shehryar Tiwana.

Track listing

References

External links

2012 Pakistani television series debuts